Adil Ray  (born 26 April 1974) is a British actor, comedian and radio/television presenter. Ray stars in the BBC One comedy Citizen Khan, which he created and co-writes, as well as presenting on various BBC radio stations. He is also a presenter on ITV's Good Morning Britain, and has played the role of Sadiq Nawaz in the Channel 4 drama series Ackley Bridge. In 2021 he presented the revival of the British game show Lingo.

Early life
Ray was born in Birmingham, England, to a Pakistani Muslim father from Lahore, and a Kenyan mother. He was brought up in the suburb of Yardley. Ray's father Abdul worked as a bus driver for almost forty years. His mother worked for the Immigration Appeals Department in the Civil Service and was of Buganda and Kenyan Asian ancestry.

Ray attended Yardley Junior and Infant School and Handsworth Grammar School, his first day being the day after the Handsworth Riots in 1985. Ray was a keen cricketer and represented Birmingham and District Premier League side West Bromwich Dartmouth during the late-1980s and early-1990s. Ray graduated from the University of Huddersfield with a 2:1 BA (Hons) in Marketing in 1997.

Career
Ray began his career as a radio host on a pirate radio station in Huddersfield while studying at the University of Huddersfield, and DJing at the university venue Eden (1992). Later, during his placement year, he got a job with a new small Asian radio station in Birmingham where he spent the first half of the year, before moving on to Choice FM (1995). In 1997, Ray landed a spot with Galaxy 105. He then joined Century Radio in Manchester, Radio Aire Leeds and Ministry of Sound Radio.

BBC
Ray joined the BBC Asian Network in 2002 to present the late night Adil Ray Show. In May 2006, Ray took over the drive time afternoon slot, and from January 2009 he presented the station's Breakfast Show from 7:00am each weekday. In 2008 The Adil Ray Show won the best radio show category at the UK Asian Music Awards.

Ray has been a regular on BBC Radio 5 Live presenting the late night show, the Football and Cricket 606 phone ins, Victoria Derbyshire, Weekend Breakfast and Fighting Talk. Ray has also fronted documentaries for BBC Radio 4, including Picturing Britain
and Towering Ambition. He has also appeared in the award-winning BBC Asian Network radio soap, Silver Street.

He also presented the British Asian Arts and Lifestyle show Desi DNA on BBC Two, and hosted the BBC Four programme Tales from Europe where he explored the 24-hour lifestyle in Madrid. In 2007, Ray presented the Royal Television Society award-nominated show Is it Cos I Is Black? for BBC Three where he looked at the issue of political correctness. He has also filmed a documentaries strand for BBC Two called Explore, in which he reported from Argentina and Turkey. In 2010 he appeared in the BBC Two comedy show Bellamy's People, playing characters including self-appointed "community leader" Mr Khan and Birmingham "Muslim DJ" MC Raa.

In 2010, Ray reprised his role as Mr. Khan to feature in his own web series for BBC Comedy to cover the UK general election. Mr. Khan returned later in the year with a follow-up BBC Comedy web series about the cricket to coincide with the Pakistan national team's visit to England that year.

In the summer of 2010, Ray joined BBC Radio 5 Live as part of their cricket coverage, travelling to Sri Lanka and Bangladesh to cover the 2011 Cricket World Cup. He can often be heard presenting the 5 Live late-night show. Ray continues to make documentaries for BBC Radio 4 including recently 'The Real Mr. Khan' a documentary looking into the role of community leaders. Ray also tackled the issue of sex and grooming in the British Pakistani community in a BBC Radio 4 documentary entitled The Sex Lives of British Pakistanis that was broadcast on 4 July 2011.

Ray covered the issue of grooming in a highly acclaimed BBC Three documentary in December 2011 – Exposed: Groomed For Sex.

Meanwhile, in 2011 Ray continued his venture into comedy including the radio pilot 'Sparkhill Sound' that broadcast on BBC Radio 4 on 12 May 2011. A community radio station set in Birmingham. Ray was both writer and performer alongside Anil Gupta (writer), Gary Pillai, and Vineeta Rishi (cast).

In 2015, Ray guest presented three episodes of The One Show alongside Alex Jones.

ITV
In August 2018 Ray temporarily replaced Piers Morgan as a co-host on ITV's Good Morning Britain.

From February 2019, Ray has become the guest presenter for Good Morning Britain, appearing during the February, April and Summer Holidays. 

In 2020, Ray was scheduled twice weekly during the summer holidays in July and August, covering for the main presenters during their summer break. During this time Ray continued the show's coverage of the Coronavirus Pandemic, most often presenting on Thursdays with Charlotte Hawkins and Fridays with Ranvir Singh.

In 2021, Ray began presenting the revival of word based quiz show, Lingo which premiered on New Years Day.

Citizen Khan

In October 2011, Ray performed the co-written comedy Citizen Khan at the BBC Salford Sitcom Showcase, centred on Ray's comedy creation Mr Khan and his long-suffering family. Commissioned as a BBC One primetime series, the Asian Muslim sitcom follows the trials and tribulations of big-hearted, loud-mouthed, tight-fisted, self-appointed community leader Mr Khan (Adil Ray) and his long-suffering family: wife Mrs Khan (Shobu Kapoor) and daughters Shazia (Maya Sondhi) and Alia (Bhavna Limbachia).

The six 30-minute episodes of Citizen Khan were commissioned by Danny Cohen, BBC One Controller, and Cheryl Taylor, Controller of Comedy Commissioning, and have been produced by BBC In-House Comedy. The Executive Producer is Mark Freeland, the Producer is Paul Schlesinger (Twenty Twelve) and the Director is Nick Wood (Fresh Meat, Not Going Out, Two Pints of Lager and a Packet of Crisps). Citizen Khan is written by Anil Gupta and Richard Pinto (The Kumars at No 42, Goodness Gracious Me) with Adil Ray.

Personal life
Ray is a keen cricket fan and supports his local team Warwickshire and the national team of his father's origin, Pakistan. He is also a fan of Aston Villa F.C.

Honours, awards and nominations
UK Asian Music Award  –  Best Radio Show (2008)
Royal Television Award Nomination – Is It Coz I Is Black (2007)

In January 2013, Ray was nominated for the Arts and Culture Awareness award at the British Muslim Awards.

Ray was appointed Officer of the Order of the British Empire (OBE) in the 2016 Birthday Honours for services to broadcasting.

Credits

Television

Radio

References

External links 

 
 
 

1974 births
21st-century British male actors
Alumni of the University of Huddersfield
BBC Asian Network presenters
British Asian writers
British comedy writers
British game show hosts
British male actors
British male actors of South Asian descent
British male comedians
British male television actors
British Muslims
British people of Kenyan descent
British stand-up comedians
Comedians from Birmingham, West Midlands
Living people
Muslim writers
Officers of the Order of the British Empire
People from Birmingham, West Midlands
Pirate radio personalities